Rockford is a town in Coosa County, Alabama, United States. At the 2020 census, the population was 349. The town is the county seat of Coosa County and is part of the Talladega-Sylacauga Micropolitan Statistical Area.

History
Coosa County was created by an act of the Alabama State Legislature on December 18, 1832 and a site on Hatchet Creek was chosen as the county seat and given the name Lexington. In 1835 the name was changed to Rockford.

Geography
Rockford is located at  (32.888181, -86.219575).

The town is located in the central part of the state along U.S. Route 231, which runs south to north through the center of town, leading north 21 mi (34 km) to Sylacauga and south 28 mi (45 km) to Wetumpka. Alabama State Route 22 meets US 231 in the center of town, leading east 18 mi (29 km) to Alexander City and west 29 mi (47 km) to Clanton.

Soils are mostly well drained sandy loam of the Wedowee series. Loams and silt loams of the Baden, Tallapoosa and Fruithurst series are common on the northern outskirts.

Climate
According to the Köppen climate classification, Rockford has a humid subtropical climate (abbreviated Cfa).

Demographics

2020 census

As of the 2020 United States census, there were 349 people, 261 households, and 164 families residing in the town.

2000 census
As of the census of 2000, there were 428 people, 189 households, and 113 families residing in the town. The racial makeup of the town was 65.65% White, 32.48% Black or African American, 0.23% Pacific Islander, and 1.64% from two or more races. 1.17% of the population were Hispanic or Latino of any race.

There were 189 households, out of which 32.8% had children under the age of 18 living with them, 34.9% were married couples living together, 19.0% had a female householder with no husband present, and 40.2% were non-families. 38.6% of all households were made up of individuals, and 22.8% had someone living alone who was 65 years of age or older. The average household size was 2.13 and the average family size was 2.81.

In the town, the population was spread out, with 24.5% under the age of 18, 7.7% from 18 to 24, 29.0% from 25 to 44, 18.5% from 45 to 64, and 20.3% who were 65 years of age or older. The median age was 39 years. For every 100 females, there were 91.9 males. For every 100 females age 18 and over, there were 84.6 males.

The median income for a household in the town was $20,000, and the median income for a family was $32,125. Males had a median income of $30,000 versus $17,031 for females. The per capita income for the town was $13,350. About 24.3% of families and 24.5% of the population were below the poverty line, including 27.6% of those under age 18 and 16.3% of those age 65 or over.

Education
Public education in Rockford is provided by the Coosa County Board of Education. There are four schools located in Rockford: Central High School (grades 9 through 12), Central Middle School (grades 5 through 8), Central Elementary School (grades (K through 4), and Coosa County Science and Technology Center (grades 9 through 12).

Fred the Town Dog
In 1993, a sick and bedraggled dog wandered into Rockford. The animal was called "Fred" and was nursed back to health by town residents. For the next ten years, Fred was the town mascot.

Fred gained popularity through a regular newspaper column, "A Dog's Life," about his activities and encounters, and then national recognition after he was profiled on cable TV's Animal Planet.

Fred died on December 23, 2002 in a Birmingham animal hospital, from a mysterious animal bite. He was buried behind the town's old jailhouse. A full-size grave marker, donated by a Montgomery businessman, was added in May, 2003. Fred was inducted into the Alabama Veterinary Medical Association Animal Hall of Fame in 2004.

In 2014, the story was turned into a short film documentary titled Fred: The Town Dog.

Gallery

Notable people
James K. Parsons, major general in the United States Army who received the Distinguished Service Cross for heroism in World War I
Lewis E. Parsons, Jr., United States Attorney for the Northern District of Alabama

References

External links

Towns in Coosa County, Alabama
Towns in Alabama
County seats in Alabama
Populated places established in 1832
Alexander City micropolitan area